R18 is a Ukrainian unmanned combat aerial vehicle designed to attack enemy targets with ammunition, developed by the Ukrainian organization "Aerorozvidka". Used by the Security and Defense Forces of Ukraine in the Russo-Ukrainian War, which has been ongoing since 2014.

History 
In 2016, Aerorozvidka started a program to develop the prototypes of its unmanned aerial vehicles. In 2019, the model was thoroughly tested and used during a special operation in the ATO zone.

Purpose 
R18 is a drone that has military and civilian applications. The octocopter is used for surveillance and search, delivering cargo, or inflicting damage. As of 2022, the last function in Aerorozvidka is called the most relevant because many other drones with cameras can collect information.  The complex is designed to destroy enemy equipment, small fortifications, and warehouses with ammunition.

Application 

The combat use of R18 started in 2019 during the Russo-Ukrainian War. They work with the octocopter mainly at night, using the tactics of the Special Operations Forces of the Armed Forces of Ukraine. The targets of drone attacks are mostly enemy cannons, tanks, armored vehicles, and trucks.

On the first day of Russia's large-scale invasion of Ukraine, February 24, 2022, one of the combat units prepared equipment and moved to the area of the airfield in Hostomel. Through horizontal communications, representatives of Aerorozvidka began to communicate with those involved in the events. On the first night, an R18 drone was used to inflict damage on paratroopers at the airport.

As of July 2022, 20 crews of R18 drones are working on the front lines of the Russo-Ukrainian War, which has neutralized more than 100 units of enemy equipment. In June, Aerorozvidka noted that the R18 is used by the Main Directorate of Intelligence, the Special Operations Forces of the Armed Forces of Ukraine, and other structures of the Ministry of Defense; National Guard; Security Service of Ukraine; other units of the Security and Defense Forces of Ukraine.

Characteristics 
R18 is a multirotor type unmanned aerial vehicle. It is an octocopter, that is, a multicopter with eight propellers. Accordingly, the drone has 8 engines. This number of engines is used for greater reliability. The drone has vertical takeoff and landing. Ukrainian and imported components are used in construction.

Armament 

To use the R18 drone as a bomber, Soviet RKG-3 HEAT grenades are used or RKG-1600 bombs created on their basis by gunsmiths of the Mayak plant (weight of one is 1.6 kg), both of which are capable of neutralizing lightly armored vehicles with an attack from above. The accuracy of hitting with the RKG-1600 is one square meter from a height of 300 meters. The R18 is capable of carrying three such munitions. It can fly up to 40 sorties without additional maintenance or repair.

Other characteristics 

 complex deployment time — up to 15 minutes;
 equipping with a thermal imager — yes;
 number of mounts for projectiles — 3 pcs.;
 total weight — 17 kg;
 weight without batteries — 6.45 kg;
 the weight of the battery pair is 5.55 kg;
 the weight of the thermal imaging suspension — 490 g;
 useful load capacity — up to 5 kg;
 ammunition drop height — up to 300 m / from 100 to 300 m
 speed — 12 m/s;
 vertical speed — 2.5 m/s;
 wind resistance — 10 m/s;
 ambient temperature range — from -15 to +35 °C;
 radius of action — 5 km;
 application distance — 20 km;
 flight duration — 45 minutes;
 overall (transport) dimensions — 1200x1200x400 mm;
 battery type — Li-ion 6s 24v 32500mah x 2.

Training 
The training of one R18 drone pilot lasts from two weeks to a month.

Trials 

In 2020, tests of dropping new RKG-1600 training and simulation ammunition from an R18 octocopter took place during command and staff exercises at the base of the 235th interspecies training center for military units and units ("Shirokiy Lan" training ground). It is noted that this was the first time when an Aerorozvidka attack drone was included in the combined combat training program. During testing, drone operators successfully hit all targets.

Funding 
Aerorovizdka independently collects funds from donations for the production of R18.

Assessments 
According to Aerorovizdka, a feature of the use of R18 octocopters at the front in the Russian-Ukrainian war, which has been ongoing since 2014, has been high payback. It is noted that with the help of relatively cheap equipment, it is possible to inflict significant losses on the enemy:

See also 
 List of unmanned aerial vehicles

References

External links 

 
 Inside the elite Ukrainian drone unit founded by volunteer IT experts: 'We are all soldiers now.'. Business Insider. 09.04.2022
 Small Quadcopters Rule The Battlefield In Ukraine — Which Makes Their Chinese Manufacturers Very Unhappy. Forbes. 29.04.2022
 Ukraine’s Next-Gen Anti-Tank Drones Are Bigger, Tougher And Much Smarter (Updated: New Video). Forbes. 14.07.2022
 The Ragtag Army That Won the Battle of Kyiv and Saved Ukraine. James Marson. The Wall Street Journal. 20.09.2022
 Ukraine’s R18 drone credited with inflicting $130 million in Russian army losses. Bruce Crumley, DroneDJ. 16.09.2022
  Повітряні війни. Безпілотні літальні апарати захопили небо — Texty.org.ua. 04.08.2022
  Усе для Перемоги. 31 військова розробка українців, що допомагає боронити Незалежність — dev.ua. 24.08.2022

Unmanned aerial vehicles of Ukraine
Octocopters
Military equipment of the 2022 Russian invasion of Ukraine
2010s Ukrainian aircraft